Sthefany Yoharlis Gutiérrez Gutiérrez (born 10 January 1999) is a Venezuelan actress, model and beauty pageant titleholder who was crowned Miss Venezuela 2017. She represented the state of Delta Amacuro at the pageant and represented Venezuela at the Miss Universe 2018 competition where she placed as the 2nd Runner-Up.

Life and career

Early life
Gutiérrez was born in Barcelona, Anzoátegui. Sthefany's father is from Colombia and her mother is Venezuelan. She is a law student at Santa María University in Puerto La Cruz.

Pageantry

Miss Venezuela 2017 
At the end of Miss Venezuela 2017 held on November 9, 2017, Gutiérrez was crowned Miss Venezuela 2017. She represented Venezuela in Miss Universe 2018. Gutiérrez succeeded Miss Venezuela 2016 Keysi Sayago and was crowned by her at the final event. Her court included Miss Venezuela World 2018, Veruska Ljubisavljević from Vargas and Miss Venezuela International 2018, Mariem Velazco from Barinas.

Miss Universe 2018 
In December 2018, she represented Venezuela at the Miss Universe 2018 pageant hosted in Bangkok, Thailand. She had problems with her high heels and the bottom part of her costume, which caused her to trip on stage and made her look uncomfortable. Ultimately, Gutiérrez placed as the 2nd Runner-Up, making the highest placement for Venezuela since Gabriela Isler's win in 2013.

References

External links
 Miss Venezuela Official Website
 

1999 births
Living people
Venezuelan female models
Miss Universe 2018 contestants
Miss Venezuela winners
People from Barcelona, Venezuela
People from Anzoátegui
Venezuelan people of Colombian descent
21st-century Venezuelan women